The women's volleyball tournament at the 2021 Southeast Asian Games will be held at the Đại Yên Arena in Quang Ninh from 13 May to 22 May 2022.

Draw
No draw was made following the withdrawal of Singapore leaving the number of participating team to five.

Venue

Participating nations

Squads

Results

Preliminary round
All times are Vietnam Standard Time (UTC+07:00)

|}

|}

Final round
All times are Vietnam Standard Time (UTC+07:00)

Bronze medal match

|}

Gold medal match

|}

Final standings

See also
Men's tournament

References

External links

Women's tournament
Southeast Asian Games